Chowari (also known as Chuari Khas or Chuāri Khās) is a town and a Nagar Panchayat (City  Council) in Chamba district, in the Indian state of Himachal Pradesh.

Geography

Demographics
 India census, Chowari had a population of 3016.  Males constitute 52% of the population and females 48%.  Chowari has an average literacy rate of 76%, higher than the national average of 59.5%; male literacy is 81% and female literacy is 70%.  In Chowari, 12% of the population is under 6 years of age.

References

Cities and towns in Chamba district